The Rheydt-Cologne railway is a mostly double-track electrified railway in the German state of North Rhine-Westphalia between Rheydt and Cologne-Ehrenfeld. Only the section between Rheydt Hauptbahnhof and Rheydt-Odenkirchen is single track.

History 

The first part of the line was built as part of the Mönchengladbach–Stolberg railway, which was built in stages between 1870 and 1875 by the Bergisch-Märkische Railway Company from the current Mönchengladbach Hauptbahnhof (central station) via Geneicken, Mülfort, Odenkirchen and Hochneukirch and continuing to Jülich, Eschweiler and Stolberg. In 1889, a connection was built from Hochneukirch station, which was located on this line, to the Erft Railway near Grevenbroich station. The direct link from Grevenbroich to Köln-Ehrenfeld station was opened in 1899. The direct link between Odenkirchen and Rheydt Hauptbahnhof was finally opened in 1908. This meant that the 1870 line through Geneicken, which ran to Mönchengladbach Hauptbahnhof parallel with the line through Rheydt Hauptbahnhof and which had already been duplicated, was sidelined. This section of line, which was electrified in 1968, initially continued to be used for trains from Mönchengladbach to Cologne, but it was finally closed in May 1985 and dismantled between Odenkirchen and Geneicken.

Operations 
The line is served by Regional-Express service RE 8 (Rhein-Erft-Express), operating with class 425 electric multiple units, and Regionalbahn service RB 27 (Rhein-Erft-Bahn) operating with a class 143 electric locomotive  and three double-deck coaches. Each service operates hourly.

External links 

NRW Railways archive of André Joost :
 [strecken/2611.htm Beschreibung der Strecke 2611] (Köln-Ehrenfeld Gbf ↔ Rheydt)
 [strecken/2612.htm Beschreibung der Strecke 2612] (Köln-Ehrenfeld Gbf ↔ Köln-Ehrenfeld Westkopf)
 [strecken/2613.htm Beschreibung der Strecke 2613] (Köln-Ehrenfeld Pbf ↔ Köln-Ehrenfeld Gbf)

Railway lines in North Rhine-Westphalia
Mönchengladbach
Transport in Cologne
Railway lines opened in 1870
1870 establishments in Germany